The Piragua Formation is a geologic formation in Cuba. The limestone intercalated with tuff formation preserves rudist fossils dating back to the Santonian period.

Fossil content 
 Durania curasavica, D. lopeztrigoi
 Praebarrettia corrali 
 Torreites tschoppi
 Vaccinites inaequicostatus
 Plagioptychus sp.
 ?Mitrocaprina sp.

See also 
 List of fossiliferous stratigraphic units in Cuba

References

Further reading 
 
 R. Rojas, M. Iturralde Vinent, and P. W. Skelton. 1995. Stratigraphy, composition and age of Cuban rudist-bearing deposits. Revista Mexicana de Ciencias Geológicas 12(2):272-291

Geologic formations of Cuba
Cretaceous Cuba
Santonian Stage
Limestone formations
Tuff formations
Shallow marine deposits
Formations